Sultan Ombra Amilbangsa was a Sultan Of Sulu and a Filipino politician served as a member of the House of Representatives of the Philippines from the 1st until the  representing the lone district of Sulu.

Amilbangsa filed a House Bill No. 5682 in 1961 before the House of Representatives during the fourth session of the 4th Congress which calls for the granting of independence to the Province of Sulu as a sovereign nation due to what he felt was negligence of the central government over the concerns of his province. The measure was not acted upon by the Congress. According to an autobiography about Moro leader, Nur Misuari, Amilbangsa favored the inclusion of the disputed areas in North Borneo to an envisioned independent Sultanate of Sulu.

Amilbangsa married Sultanah Dayang-Dayang Hadji Piandao Kiram of the House of Kiram then was proclaimed as Sultan of Sulu on 1936 and this was agreed by the Council of Royal Datus and Rumah Bichara and also agreed by Sultan Jamalul Kiram II when he approved the marriage of Amilbangsa with Dayang-Dayang Hadji Piandao the daughter of Sultan Badarudin II .

References

Members of the House of Representatives of the Philippines from Sulu
KALIBAPI politicians
Filipino Muslims